The Polish United Party (PZL) was a political party in Poland.

History
The party was established in Congress Poland in 1917 as the "United Party", but was renamed PZL in 1918 after several members defected to the Polish People's Party "Piast". The party contested the January 1919 elections to elect the first Sejm of the Second Polish Republic. It received 3.8% of the vote, winning 35 seats.

However, it split in August 1919, with some members joining Narodowe Zjednoczenie Ludowe and others joining Polish People's Party "Wyzwolenie".

References

Defunct political parties in Poland
Political parties established in 1917
Political parties disestablished in 1919
Agrarian parties in Poland